The 1952 United States presidential election in Nebraska took place on November 4, 1952, as part of the 1952 United States presidential election. Voters chose six representatives, or electors, to the Electoral College, who voted for president and vice president.

Nebraska was won by Columbia University President Dwight D. Eisenhower (R–New York), running with Senator Richard Nixon, with 69.15% of the popular vote, against Adlai Stevenson (D–Illinois), running with Senator John Sparkman, with 30.85% of the popular vote.

With 69.15% of the popular vote, Nebraska would be Eisenhower's fourth strongest state after Vermont, North Dakota and South Dakota

Results

Results by county

See also
 United States presidential elections in Nebraska

References

Nebraska
1952
1952 Nebraska elections